is a Japanese comedy manga series by Kira Inugami and SCA-ji, serialized in Kadokawa Shoten's Comp Ace magazine. Three volumes have been released as of June 2012. A 10-episode original net animation adaptation by AIC ran on niconico between July and September, 2012. Following the ONA series, an OVA episode was bundled with the fourth volume of the manga, released in December 2012. The series has been licensed by Sentai Filmworks in North America.

Plot
Itsuki Noya is a new student at Ebisugawa High School who joins his school's astronomy club only to discover that its club room is in the basement for some reason. What he finds inside is that the club is filled with weirdos who all happen to be girls.

Characters

A young boy who is the male heir of the Noya Group. Upon joining the Astronomical Club under the assumption it was the Astronomy Club, he is forced to crossdress, as Kyoko only wanted girls to join.

The Astronomical Club's delusional president who has a wild personality and is constantly harassing Hakata.

Kyoko's younger sister and Itsuki's personal maid, who is constantly treating him as her toy, forcing him to call her Elizabeth Margaret. Not willing to relinquish Itsuki to Kyoko, she transfers schools and joins the Astronomical Club. Although she treats Noya as her toy, she appears to have genuine feelings for him.

An author of yaoi dōjinshi who is constantly being sexually harassed by Kyoko.

An emotionless girl who simply goes with the flow. She appears to have a fetish for cats.

A polite and kindhearted member of the Astronomical Club, who is often seen conversing with Yuka. She will occasionally emit a scary aura.

The tsundere student council president who is constantly looking for a reason to shut down the Astronomical Club. She has feelings for Hasumi. She is also afraid of cats.

Supposedly the club's advisor, although she constantly insists that a cat is the advisor in order to escape harsh reality.

Itsuki's older brother and Shōko's "boyfriend". He is the same kind of person as Kyōko, but at a professional level.

Media

Manga
The manga is serialized in Seinen magazine Comp Ace, running from December 2008.

Anime
A 10-episode original net animation adaptation by AIC Classic was streamed on Nico Nico Douga between July 14, 2012 and September 15, 2012. A television broadcast featuring longer episodes began airing from October 3, 2012 and is being streamed by Crunchyroll. An OVA episode was bundled with the fourth volume of the manga, released in January 2013. The series has been licensed in North America by Sentai Filmworks. Each episode parodies an anime or television show.

Episode list

Music

Opening theme

References

External links
Official site 

2008 manga
2012 anime ONAs
2012 anime OVAs
Anime International Company
Comedy anime and manga
Harem anime and manga
Kadokawa Shoten manga
School life in anime and manga
Seinen manga
Sentai Filmworks